Gılgameş (Op. 65) is an opera in three acts and twelve scenes composed by Ahmed Adnan Saygun to a Turkish-language libretto by . The opera, based on the Epic of Gilgamesh was composed from 1964 to 1983, but premiered in an early version in 1970.

See also
 Gilgamesh in the arts and popular culture
 Gilgamesh (disambiguation)#Operas

References

1970 operas
Operas
Turkish-language operas
Operas by Ahmet Adnan Saygun
Operas based on literature
Works based on the Epic of Gilgamesh